Francisco Diego is a Mexican plastic artist.

His most recent exposition “Mexico in a Blink” took place in San Francisco and will travel through United States along the year.

Biography 
Francisco Diego was born on October 26, 1991 in Torreón, Coahuila, México. At a very young age He moved to the historical city of Querétaro in Mexico where  he started painting.

Influenced by his artistic background he left Querétaro to start his studies. He completed a Design degree at Universidad Iberoamericana in Mexico City and Politecnico di Torino in Turin, Italy.

He established his own studio in Mexico City.

Philosophy 
Life is like a white canvas, each line drawn, smooth or rough is an action taken. As in life, actions can’t be erased. The only thing to correct any misplaced stroke is to keep drawing and reinforcing the final silhouette. Aware of this poetic point of view about life, Francisco Diego only uses permanent black ink. If you stare closely at any Francisco Diego you might see all the previous strokes, making viewers wonder about the process of creation.

Exhibitions 

 "Al" Embassy in Mexico, Mexico City, 2018.
"SNAC Gallery"  Touring North America, 2018.
 "Ethos"  in Museo Franz Mayer, Mexico City, 2018.
 "Mexico in a Blink" , San Francisco, California, USA, 2017–2018.
 "Black Dott", México City, 2018.
 "555 Project", Mexico City, 2017.
"Dimensión −1", Museo de Arte Sacro, Querétaro, 2016.

References

External links
 Francisco Diego Homepage
 Sánchez Guadarrama Gerardo, 2017, “Los artistas Belén Berdeja y Francisco Diego que están poniendo en alto el nombre de México”,  CULTURA COLECTIVA Magazine,(10.10.2017)
Notimex, 2017, "Artista emergente Francisco Diego comparte historias a través de su obra", 20 MINUTOS Newspaper, Mexico, (08.07.2017)
 Cata Marin, 2017, “El Artista Visual, Millennial y Mexicano que “Cruza el Muro Fronterizo” con su Arte”, ETER Magazine, Mexico, (10.10.2017) 

Mexican painters
1991 births
Living people